Sites House, also known as Sites Plantation, is a historic home located near Broadway, Rockingham County, Virginia. It was built in 1801, and is a two-story, limestone structure with a side gable roof.  It has a central chimney and a full-width front porch.  In the late-19th century, an undistinguished three-bay frame wing with a two-story gallery was attached to the rear.

It was listed on the National Register of Historic Places in 1979.

References

Houses on the National Register of Historic Places in Virginia
Houses completed in 1801
Houses in Rockingham County, Virginia
National Register of Historic Places in Rockingham County, Virginia